AtlasGlobal Ukraine, branded as atlasglobal UA, was the Ukrainian subsidiary of AtlasGlobal headquartered in Lviv. Its main base was at Kyiv Zhuliany Airport, though the airline only flew one regularly scheduled route out of Odesa International Airport.

History
Founded in 2013, AtlasGlobal - Ukraine was set up as the Ukrainian division of Turkish parent company AtlasGlobal.

On 29 November 2019, it has been reported that lessors took in both of the airline's Airbus A320-200s in the wake of the financial struggle of parent company AtlasGlobal, leaving AtlasGlobal Ukraine without any aircraft.

In March 2020, the Ukrainian aviation authority permanently revoked the airline's operating license.

Destinations
As of November 2019, AtlasGlobal operated a single scheduled route:

Fleet

The AtlasGlobal Ukraine fleet included the following aircraft as of November 2019:

References

External links
AtlasGlobal Ukraine official website 

Defunct airlines of Ukraine
Airlines established in 2013
Airlines disestablished in 2019
Ukrainian companies established in 2013
2019 disestablishments in Ukraine